This is a list of Iranian Azerbaijani notable people by birth or ancestry, ethnicity or nationality, arranged by main profession then birthdate. For similar reasons related to ethnogenesis and national identity, this list starts from the  early modern history of Azerbaijan and Iran, when the Safavids established a national state officially known as Persia or Iran and reasserted the Iranian identity of the region.

Iranian Azeribaijanis, a Turkic-speaking people, are Iranians of Azerbaijani ethnicity who may speak the Azerbaijani language as their first language. They are mainly settled in and are native to the Iranian Azerbaijan region including provinces of East Azerbaijan, Ardabil, Zanjan and West Azerbaijan, and in smaller numbers, in other provinces such as Kurdistan, Qazvin, Hamadan, Gilan, Markazi and Kermanshah, also constitute a significant minority in Tehran, Karaj and other regions. They are  known by variant and similar names in Persian and Azerbaijani languages, depending on the identity and self-preference, including: Azeri, Azerbaijani, Azeri-speaker, South Azerbaijani  or Southern Azerbaijani, Turk etc with the prefix of "Iranian" or "Persian" to distinguish from the people of the Republic of Azerbaijan which was formed in 1918.
 
This list is not automatically filled with notables from Iranian Azerbaijan region, but the following Iranian people have either stated that they are Azerbaijanis or that credible sources indicate that. To be included in this list, the person must have a Wikipedia article and references showing the person is Azerbaijani and Iranian.

Arts and entertainment

Music

Singers 
 Fatma Mukhtarova – (6 March 1893 or 1898, Urmia – 19 October 1972, Baku) opera singer; Iran-born Soviet Azerbaijani, paternal Iranian Azeri, maternal Tatar.
 Rubaba Muradova – (21 March 1930, Ardabil – 28 August 1983, Baku) opera and folk singer; Bakuvian of Ardabili descent.
 Aref – (10 August 1940, Tehran) pop singer and former actor; of Ardabili descent, Iranian-American.  
 Homeyra  – (17 March 1945, Tehran) pop singer.
 Sattar – (19 November 1949, Tehran)  Persian pop and classical singer.
 Googoosh – (5 May 1950, Tehran) singer and actress; Iranian of Soviet Azerbaijani descent.  
 Dariush Eghbali – (4 February 1951, Tehran) singer.
 Hasan Anami Olya – (15 March 1967) opera singer; Baku-based Iranian Azeri.
 Rahim Shahriari – (20 February 1971, Tabriz) singer and songwriter.
 Mansour – (28 July 1971, Tehran) pop singer, actor and fashion designer.
 Arash – (23 April 1977, Tehran) singer, entertainer, and producer; Iranian-Swedish  of Azeri descent.
 Sami Yusuf – (21 July 1980, Tehran) singer, songwriter, multi-instrumentalist and composer; British Iran-born of Soviet Azerbaijani descent 
 Omid Hajili – (24 September 1983, Tehran)  pop singer and composer.

Composers and instrumentalists 
 Qolam-Hussein Bijekhani  – (1918, Tabriz – 13 April 1987, Tabriz) tar player.
 Ali Salimi  – (1922, Baku – 22 April 1997, Tabriz) composer and tar player; Bakuvian of Azeri Ardabili descent.
 Samin Baghtcheban  – (1923, Tabriz – 19 March 2008, Istanbul) composer, author and literary translator.
 Farhad Fakhreddini – (11 March 1939, Gədəbəy) composer, conductor; Iranian of Soviet Azerbaijani descent.  
 Nasrollah Nasehpour  – (24 October 1940, Ardabil) composer and singer.
 Mahmud Shaterian  – (1944, Tabriz – 22 September 2006, Tabriz) composer and tar player.
 Naser Cheshmazar – (31 December 1950, Ardabil – 4 May 2018, Tehran) composer and pianist.  
 Hossein Alizadeh – (23 August 1951, Tehran)  composer and multi-instrumental; maternal Araki Persian, paternal Urmian Azeri.
 Dariush Pirniakan  – (13 April 1955, Gargar) composer and tar player.
 Davood Azad  – (6 October 1963, Urmia) singer, multi-instrumental musician and composer.

Visual arts

Calligraphers 
 Ali Reza Abbasi (?, Tabriz  – 1616) calligrapher.  
 Abd al-Baghi Tabrizi – (? – 1629, Tabriz) calligrapher.  
 Ala' al-Din Tabrizi – (16th-century) calligrapher and painter. 
 Mohammad Hossein Tabrizi – (16th-century) calligrapher.  
 Ali Adjalli – (8 February  1939, Miyaneh) calligrapher, painter, poet and educator.

Filmmaking

Actors

Directors 
 Valiollah Khakdan – (1923, Baku – 9 September 1996, Tehran)  art director and scenic designer.   
 Yadollah Samadi – (17 November 1952, Maraga – 25 September 2018, Shiraz) film director.  
 Rasoul Mollagholipour  – (1955, Tehran – 6 March 2007, Nowshahr) film director.  
 Majid Gharizadeh – (1955, Tehran) film director.
 Tahmineh Milani – (6 September 1960) film director and  feminist activist; paternal Persian and maternal Azeri.  
 Kamal Tabrizi – (28 October 1959, Tehran) film director.
 Jafar Panahi – (11 July 1960, Mianeh) film director, screenwriter and film editor.  
 Ebrahim Hatamikia – (23 September 1961, Tehran) film director, screenwriter, cinematographer and actor.
 Reza Mirkarimi – (27 January 1967, Tehran) screenwriter and film director.
 Masoud Dehnamaki – (29 December 1969, Ahar)  conservative activist, filmmaker, and former journalist; paternal Persian, maternal Azeri.
 Ali Samadi Ahadi – (9 February 1972, Tabriz) filmmaker and scriptwriter; Iranian-German.

Painters, photogeraphers and cartoonists 
 Sadiqi Beg –  (1533, Tabriz – 1610, Isfahan) painter, miniaturist,  poet and writer. 
 Ibrahim Mirza – (April 1540 – 23 February 1577) Safavid prince,  miniaturist and poet 
 Mihr 'Ali –  (1795 –  1830) court painter. 
 Ahmad Aali – (1935, Tabriz) photographer.
 Mansoor Ghandriz – (2 March 1936, Tabriz – 26 February 1966)  painter.
 Aydin Aghdashloo – (30 October 1940, Rasht) painter, graphist and art curator;  Iranian of Soviet Azerbaijani descent.
 Haydar Hatemi – (3 March 1945, Gargar) painter, sculptor; Iranian-American of Azeri descent.
 Reza Deghati – (26 July 1952, Tabriz)  photojournalist; Iranian-French of Azeri descent.
 Javad Alizadeh – (9 January 1953, Ardabil) comic artist, cartoonist, art writer and blogger.
 Khosrow Hassanzadeh – (1963, Tehran) painter, installation artist and ceramist.

Sculptors 
 Ahad Hosseini – (4 August 1944, Tabriz) sculptor and painter.
 Akbar Behkalam – (16 September 1944, Tabriz) painter and sculptor; Iranian-German.

Branches of science

Applied science 
 Javad Heyat – (24 May 1925, Tabriz – 12 August 2014, Baku) surgeon, journalist and writer. 
 Rahim Rahmanzadeh – (13 June 1934, Shabestar) academic, physician and surgeon; Iranian-German of Azerbaijani descent.
 Abass Alavi – (1938, Tabriz) physician-scientist specializing in the field of molecular imaging; Iranian-American.

Formal science 
 Mohsen Hashtroodi – (13 January 1908, Tabriz – 4 September 1976, Tehran) mathematician and poet. 
 Lotfi A. Zadeh – (4 February 1921, Baku – 6 September 2017, Berkeley)  mathematician, computer scientist, electrical engineer, artificial intelligence researcher, and professor of computer science; of Iranian Azerbaijani and Russian Jewish descent.
 Maryam Sadeghi – (1980, Miyaneh) computer scientist and businesswoman in the field of medical image analysis; Iranian-Canadian of Azerbaijani descent.

Natural sciences 
 Ali Javan –  (26 December 1926, Tehran – 12 September 2016, Los Angeles)  physicist and inventor;  Iranian-American of Tabrizi Azerbaijani descent.

Social science 
 Alexander Kazembek – (22 July 1802, Rasht – 27 November 1870, St.Petersburg) orientalist, historian, philologist; Iranian-Russian of Azeri descent.
 Hasan Rushdiya –  (4 July 1851, Tabriz – 12 December 1944, Qom) educational theorist, schoolteacher, journalist and writer.  
 Jabbar Baghtcheban – (9 May 1886, Yerevan – 25 November 1966, Tehran) educational theorist, schoolteacher, inventor and writer. 
 Ahmad Kasravi –  (29 September 1890, Tabriz – 11 March 1946, Tehran) linguist, nationalist, religious reformer and historian. 
 Hamid Notghi – (11 September 1920, Tabriz – 16 July 1999, London) public relation theorist, lawyer, poet, academic and essayist.  
 Ali Murad Davudi – (1922, Shams Abad –  11 November 1979, Tehran) educational philosopher; Iranian Azeribaijani of Georgian descent.
 Homa Nategh – (26 May 1934, Urmia – 1 January 2016, Arrou, France)  historian.
 Dariush Shayegan – (24 January 1935, Tabriz – 22 March 2018, Tehran) Iranologist and philosopher; of Georgian and Azeri descent. 
 Shireen Hunter – (1945, Tabriz)  political scientists; Iranian Azeri-American. 
 Javad Tabatabai – (14 December 1945, Tabriz – 28 February 2023, Irvine, California)  philosopher and political scientist.
 Farideh Heyat – (20 June 1949, Tehran)  anthropologist and a writer;  British-Iranian of Azeri descent.

Literature

Literary scholars 
 Mohammad-Amin Riahi – (1 June 1923, Khoy – 15 May 2009, Tehran)  literary scholar, historian, writer, poet and statesman. 
 Reza Seyed-Hosseini – (15 October 1926, Ardabil – 1 May 2009, Tehran) literary translator.
 Jaleh Amouzgar – (4 December 1939, Khoy) linguist, literary scholar and academic.
 Naser Manzuri – (1953, Mianeh)  linguist and novelist.

Non-fiction writers 
 Mohammad Hossein bin Khalaf Tabrizi – (1600, Tabriz – 1651, ?) lexicographer.   
 Mirza Abu Taleb Khan  – (1752, Lucknow – 1805, Bundelkhand) writer and poet; Indian-Iranian of Azerbaijani descent.  
 Abbasgulu Bakikhanov – (21 June 1794 – 31 May 1847) writer, linguist and poet; Qajar Iranian-Imperial Russian. 
 Fatali Akhundov – (12 July 1812, Nukha – 9 March 1878, Tiflis) author, playwright, ultra-nationalist, philosopher; Qajar Iranian Azerbaijani. 
 Abd al-Rahim Talibov – (1834, Tabriz -11 March 1911, Temir-Khan-Shura) political writer, essayist and translator.  
 Jalil Mammadguluzadeh – (22 February 1869, Nehrəm – 4 January 1932, Baku) literary journalist, teacher and writer; Russian/Soviet Azerbaijani of Iranian Azeri descent.  
 Ismail Amirkhizi –  (1873, Tabriz – 16 February 1966, Tehran) writer, politician and poet. 
 Mohammad Ali Modarres Khiabani – (1878, Tabriz – 5 April 1954, Tabriz) writer and linguist. 
 Mirza Ibrahimov –  (15 October 1911, Eyvaq, Sarab – 17 December 1993, Baku) writer, playwright, and public figure;Soviet Azerbaijani of Iranian Azeri descent. 
 Abbas Zaryab – (13 August 1919, Khoy – 3 February 1995, Tehran) historian, translator, literature Professor and Iranologist.

Fiction writers 
 Ganjali Sabahi  – (1906, Marand  – 6 September 1990, Tehran)  novelist, short story writer, poet and  literary critic.
 Mir Jalal Pashayev – (26 April 1908, Andabil, Ardabil – 28 September 1978, Baku) short story writer and  literary critic.
 Gholam-Hossein Bigdeli – (16 March 1919, Durakhlu – 16 August 1998, Karaj) literary scholar, linguist, historian, writer and poet; of Begdili descent.
 Gholam-Hossein Sa'edi – (15 January 1936, Tabriz – 23 November 1985, Paris) fiction and non-fiction writer.  
 Samad Behrangi – (24 June 1939, Tabriz – 31 August 1968, Aras River) short story writer, teacher and poet. 
 Fariba Vafi – (21 January 1963, Tabriz) novelist and short story writer.
 Mohammadreza Bayrami – (born 1965), short story writer and novelist.

Poets

Media

Broadcasters 
 Mübariz Alizade – (1911, Tabriz – 1994, Baku)  activist and radio broadcaster.
 Bahman Hashemi – (24 July 1962, Tehran)  TV presenter and actor.
 Javad Khiabani – (18 November 1966) journalist, football commentator, television show host and presenter; Karaj-born of Azerbaijani descent.
 Sibel Edmonds – (18 January 1970, Tabriz) journalist and writer; Iranian-American of Azeri and Turkish descent.
 Reza Rashidpour  – (9 August 1975, Tehran) TV presenter, producer, actor and director.

Journalists 
 Mohammad Ali Tarbiat – (26 May 1877, Tabriz – 17 January 1940, Tehran) journalist, writer, parliamentarian and government official. 
 Taqi Rafat - (1885, Tabriz – 15 September 1920, Tabriz) journalist, poet and playwright.

Military 
 Mohammad Taqi Pessian – (1892, Tabriz – 3 October 1921, Quchan) gendarme, fighter pilot, warlord and politician.  
 Ghulam Yahya Daneshian – (1906, Sarab – 2006, Baku) Commander of National Army of the Azerbaijan People's Government. 
 Abbas Gharabaghi –  (1 November 1918, Tabriz – 14 October 2000, Paris)  chief of staff of the Iranian armed forces.
 Javad Fakoori – (3 January 1936, Tabriz – 29 September 1981, Kahrizak) commander of the Iranian Air Force (1980–81) and 4th defence minister of Iran.
 Mehdi Bakeri – (1954, Miandoab – 16 March 1985, Al-Qurna) Islamic Revolutionary Guard Corps commander.
 Nouraddin Afi – (1964, Khelejan, Tabriz) Basiji personnel of the Iran–Iraq War and memoirist.

Politics and government

Activists 
 Zainab Pasha – ( 1884, Tabriz – 17 March 1921, Karbala) political activist.
 Razieh Gholami-Shabani – (21 April 1925, Tabriz – 28 January 2013, Cologne) politician and activist.
 Taqi Arani – (5 September 1903, Tabriz – 4 February 1940, Tehran) communist and journalist. 
 Narges Karim Mohammadi – (21 April 1972, Zanjan) human rights activist.
 Saleh Kamrani – (31 December 1972, Ahar) lawyer, human rights defender, and politician;  Iranian-Swedish of Azerbaijani descent.
 Alireza Farshi – (17 October 1978, Marand) ethnic-cultural activist.

Officials 
 Hassan Taqizadeh – (27 September 1878, Tabriz – 28 January 1970, Tehran) politician and diplomat. 
 Mir Bashir Gasimov – (1879, Dash Bolagh, Meyaneh – 23 April 1949, Baku)  revolutionary and statesman; Soviet Azerbaijani-Iranian.
 Mohammad Sa'ed – (28 April 1881, Maragheh – 1 November 1973, Tehran) diplomat and 27th Prime Minister of Iran in 1944 and 1948-1950. 
 Abbas Adham – (1885, Tabriz – 31 October 1969, Tehran) physician and official.
 Mehdi Bazargan – (1 September 1907, Tehran – 20 January 1995, Zürich)  Islamic scholar, academic and nationalist politician; of Tabrizi Azeri descent.  
 Rahmatollah Moghaddam Maraghei  – (1921, Maragheh – 2012) official and parliamentarian. 
 Sadegh Khalkhali – (27 July 1926, Givi – 26 November 2003, Tehran) Ja'fari jurist, qadi and politician.
 Hadi Khosroshahi – (1939, Tabriz – 27 February 2020, Tehran)  Ja'fari jurist, religious politician and member of Fada'iyan-e Islam.
 Ali Khamenei – (19 April 1939) Ja'fari jurist, political leader, one of founding member of Islamic Republican Party; Iranian of Azerbaijani descent, member of Husseini Khamenei family. 
 Mir-Hossein Mousavi – (2 March 1942, Khameneh)  reformist politician, artist and architect.
 Hossein Hashemi – (7 July 1953, Mianeh)  industrial engineer and politician.
 Masoud Pezeshkian – (29 September 1954, Mahabad) parliamentarian,  reformist politician and Minister of Health and Medical Education (22 August 2001 – 24 August 2005).
 Mohsen Mehralizadeh – (30 September 1956, Maragheh) reformist politician and government official.
 Abd al-Naser Hemmati – (1957, Kabudarahang) academic, politician and economist.
 Ali Nikzad – (1961, Ardabil)  conservative politician, parliamentarian, academic and official.

Parliament and party members

Religion

Sports

Executives and administrators 
 Ali Fathollahzadeh – (9 January 1959, Khoy) businessman and football administrator.

Individual sports

Combat sports 
 Hamid Reza Gholipour – (26 June 1988, Karaj)  wushu and sanshou practitioner.

Taekwondo 
 Yousef Karami  – (22 March 1983, Meyaneh) taekwondo athlete.
 Kimia Alizadeh – (10 July 1998, Karaj)  Taekwondo athlete; Karaj-born of Zonuzi descent.
 Mirhashem Hosseini– (28 October 1998, Miyaneh) taekwondo practitioner.

Wrestling 
 Gholamreza Takhti – (27 August 1930, Tehran – 7 January 1968, Tehran) Olympic Gold-Medalist wrestler, Varzesh-e Bastani practitioner, philanthropist and folk hero; of Hamadani Turkic descent.
 Ayoub Baninosrat – (10 January 1968, Tabriz) wrestler and academic.
 Masoud Hashemzadeh  – (21 September 1981, Mianeh) wrestler.
 Arash Keshavarzi  – (16 February 1987, Tehran) volleyball player.
 Afshin Biabangard – (1 August 1987, Parsabad) wrestler.
 Parviz Hadi  – (16 November 1987, Basmenj) wrestler.

Weightlifting 
 Saeid Azari – (21 March 1968, Isfahan) retired weightlifter, coach and football chairman; Isfahan-born of Iranian Azerbaijani descent.
 Hossein Rezazadeh – (12 May 1978, Ardabil) weightlifter.
 Rouhollah Dadashi  – (24 January 1982, Meyaneh – 16 July 2011, Karaj)  powerlifter, bodybuilder and strongman.
 Sajjad Anoushiravani – (12 May 1984, Ardabil) weightlifter.
 Saeid Alihosseini – (2 February 1988, Ardabil) retired super heavyweight weightlifter.

Paralympic athletes 
 Hamed Heidari – (26 March  1991, Kolowr) Paralympian athlete and  javelin thrower.

Team sports

Football

Volleyball 
 Behnam Mahmoudi – (25 April 1980, Meyaneh)  former volleyball player.
 Morteza Sharifi - (27 May 1999, Urmia) volleyball player. 
 Saeid Marouf – (20 October 1985, Urmia)  volleyball setter.
 Shahram Mahmoudi – (20 July  1988, Mianeh) volleyball player.
 Purya Fayazi – (12 January 1993, Tehran) volleyball player.
 Amir Hossein Toukhteh – (9 April 2001, Urmia) volleyball player. 
 Bardia Saadat (12 August 2002, Urmia)  volleyball player.

Miscellaneous 
 Rizali Khajavi  – (24 February 1931, Mianeh – 2 December 2017, Tabriz) farmer and folk courage hero.
 Esmail Rangraz  – (1975, Moghan – 19 September 2017, Moghan)  serial killer.
 Sakineh Mohammadi Ashtiani  – (1967, Tabriz) convicted of conspiracy to commit murder and adultery, victim of human rights abuse.
 Hadis Najafi – (5 January 2000, Karaj – 21 September 2022, Karaj) victim of violence during Mahsa Amini protests.
 Asra Panahi – (5 March 2007, Ardabil – 12 October 2022, Ardabil) victim of violence during Mahsa Amini protests.

See also 
 List of Iranians
 List of people from Tabriz

Footnotes

References

Citations

Bibliography

 
 
 
 
  
 
  
 
 
 
 
 

Lists of Azerbaijani people

Azerbaijanis